HMS Greyhound was a 20-gun sixth-rate ship of the Royal Navy, built in 1740-41 according to the 1733 modifications of the 1719 Establishment, and in service in the West Indies, the Americas and the Caribbean. After extensive service including the single-handed capture of two other ships of equivalent size and armament, Greyhound was driven ashore in the River Thames at Erith, Kent in January 1768. She was consequently declared unseaworthy and sold out of service three months later.

References

Bibliography
 

Individual sailing vessels
1741 ships
Ships built in Limehouse
Sixth rates of the Royal Navy
Maritime incidents in 1768